Mompha locupletella is a moth in the family Momphidae that can be found in the Palearctic including Europe.

Description
There are generally two generations per year, although there is only one in the north. Adults of the first generation are on wing from the second half of May to the beginning of July. The second generation adults are on wing from August to the beginning of September.

The larvae feed on Epilobium alpestre, chickweed willowherb (Epilobium alsinifolium), spear-leaved willowherb (Epilobium lanceolatum), broad-leaved willowherb (Epilobium montanum), marsh willowherb (Epilobium palustre) and Epilobium roseum. The larvae initially make a number of short corridors, either in the same leaf or different ones. The corridors initially have a central line of frass. After the corridor, an elongate blotch is made, starting at the midrib. Larvae can be found from April to May and from July to the beginning of August. Pupation takes place in a white cocoon outside of the mine, attached to vegetation or leaf litter.

Distribution
Mompha locupletella is found in northern Europe and mountainous areas in central and southern Europe, to north-western Spain. In the east, the range extends to Zabaykalsky Krai and the Kuril Islands in Russia.

References

External links
 Lepiforum e. V.
 The Barcode of Life Data Systems (BOLD)

Momphidae
Leaf miners
Moths described in 1775
Moths of Asia
Moths of Europe
Taxa named by Michael Denis
Taxa named by Ignaz Schiffermüller